The Pentax smc DA* 50-135mm F2.8 ED (IF) SDM is an interchangeable camera lens announced by Pentax on February 21, 2007.

References

External links

Camera lenses introduced in 2007
50